Bangladesh University of Professionals (BUP) is the 31st public university of Bangladesh (according to University Grants Commission of Bangladesh), located in Mirpur Cantonment, Dhaka. It is the first public
university of Bangladesh to be run by the Bangladesh Armed Forces. It was established under the Bangladesh University of Professionals Act, 2009.

History
Before the establishment of the Bangladesh University of Professionals,  all the educational institutions of the Bangladesh Armed Forces (about 56 institutions) were spread and affiliated with different public universities all over Bangladesh.

The main purpose for the establishment of BUP was to unify all the educational institutions of the Bangladesh Armed Forces under one public university run and maintained by the Armed Forces. Following the purpose, on 5 June 2008, Bangladesh University of Professionals started its journey with the motto- "Excellence through knowledge" in Mirpur Cantonment, Dhaka. Later, the Bangladesh University of Professionals Act, 2009 (Act No. 30 of 2009) was declared.

Although BUP is a military-administered institution, it is also a public university. So, anyone can study in the university following the admission test. Currently, almost all the institutions of the Bangladesh Armed Forces are affiliated with BUP.

Regulatory bodies
Senate
Syndicate
Academic Council
Finance Committee

Programs 
 Undergraduate Program
 Graduate Program
 Postgraduate Program
 Certificate Program

Faculties and departments

Faculty of Business Studies (FBS) 
Undergraduate Programs

BBA (General)
BBA in Accounting and Information Systems
BBA in Finance and Banking 
BBA in Management Studies
BBA in Marketing

Post Graduate Programs

Master of Business Administration in Accounting and Information Systems
Master of Business Administration in Finance and Banking
Master of Business Administration in Marketing
Master of Business Administration in Management Studies (HRM)
Master of Business Administration (Regular)
Master of Business Administration (Professional)

Faculty of Arts and Social Sciences (FASS) 
Undergraduate Programs

BSS (Hons.) in Sociology 
BA (Hons.) in English
BSS (Hons.) in Economics
BSS (Hons.) in Development Studies
BSS (Hons.) in Public Administration
BSS (Hons.) in Disaster & Human Security Management

Post Graduate Programs

Master of Social Science in Sociology   
Master of Social Science in Economics
Master of Social Science in Development Studies
Master of Social Science in Public Administration
Master of Disaster and Human Security Management (MDHSM)
Master of Arts in English Literature & Cultural Studies
Master of Arts in English Language Teaching & Applied Linguistics

Faculty of Security and Strategic Studies (FSSS) 
Undergraduate Programs

LLB (Hons.) in Law
BSS (Hons.) in International Relations (IR)
BSS (Hons.) in Mass Communication & Journalism
BSS (Hons.) in Peace, Conflict and Human Rights

Post Graduate Programs

Master of Laws (LLM Professionals)
Master of Law (LLM)
Master of International Relations (MIR)
Master of Peace, Conflict & Human Rights Studies (MPCHRS)

Faculty of Science and Technology (FST) 
Undergraduate Programs

BSc in Information & Communication Engineering - ICE
BSc (Hons.) in Environmental Science - ES
BSc in Computer Science and Engineering - CSE

Post Graduate Programs

Master in Information & Communication Technology (MICT)
Master in Information Systems Security (MISS)
Master in Information and Communication Engineering (MICE)
M.Sc./Masters in Environmental Science and Management (MESM)

Faculty of Medical Studies (FMS) 
Food & Nutrition
Pharmacy
Public Health & Informatics

Centre for Higher Studies & Research 
 Master of Philosophy
 Doctor of Philosophy
 Postdoctoral Research
 Publications

Centre for Modern Languages 
 English
 French
 German
 Japanese
 Chinese
 Turkish
 Arabic

Office of the Evaluation, Faculty & Curriculum Development 
 Faculty Development Section
 Curriculum Development Section
 Institutional Quality Assurance Cell

List of vice-chancellors 

Major General Md Emdad-Ul-Bari (11 February, 2018 -  02 March, 2020)
Major General Ataul Hakim Sarwar Hasan (3rd March, 2020- 1st December, 2020)
Major General Md Moshfequr Rahman (31 December, 2020 - 04 April, 2022)
Major General Md Mahbub-ul Alam (05 April, 2022 - Present)

Affiliates
 Armed Forces Medical College (AFMC)
Army Institute of Business Administration, Savar (Army IBA)
Army Institute of Business Administration, Sylhet (AIBA)
Army Medical Colleges (AMC)
Bangladesh Air Force Academy (BAFA)
Bangladesh Military Academy (BMA)
Bangladesh Naval Academy (BNA)
Defense Service Command and Staff College (DSCSC)
Military Institute of Science and Technology (MIST)
National Defense College (NDC)
Proyash Institute of Special Education and Research (PISER)

References

 
Public universities of Bangladesh
Universities and colleges in Dhaka
Military education and training in Bangladesh
Educational Institutions affiliated with Bangladesh Army
Educational institutions established in 2008
2008 establishments in Bangladesh